Product is the fourth studio album by British jazz fusion group Brand X, originally released in 1979. It features primary member Phil Collins back once again on drums following his absence on Masques. Drummer Mike Clark and bassist John Giblin also appear on this album.

Track listing

LP

Side one
 "Don't Make Waves" (Goodsall) – 5:28
 "Dance of the Illegal Aliens" (Jones) – 7:50
 "Soho" (Goodsall, Collins) – 3:38
 "...And So to F..." (Collins) – 6:29

Side two
 "Algon (Where an Ordinary Cup of Drinking Chocolate Costs £8,000,000,000)" (Lumley) – 6:10
 "Rhesus Perplexus" (Giblin) – 3:59
 "Wal to Wal / Not Good Enough - See Me!" – 10:44
 "Wal to Wal" (Jones, Giblin)
 "Not Good Enough - See Me!" (Jones, Robinson)
 "April" (Giblin) – 2:36

CD
 "Don't Make Waves"  (Goodsall) – 5:31	
 "Dance of the Illegal Aliens" (Jones) – 7:49
 "Soho" (Goodsall, Collins) – 3:40	
 "Not Good Enough-See Me!" (Jones, Robinson) – 7:29	
 "Algon (Where an Ordinary Cup of Drinking Chocolate Costs £8,000,000,000)" (Lumley) – 6:08	
 "Rhesus Perplexus" (Giblin) – 4:00
 "Wal to Wal" (Jones, Giblin) – 3:14	
 "...And So to F..." (Collins) – 6:28	
 "April" (Giblin) – 2:08

Personnel

except on "Dance of the Illegal Aliens"; "Wal to Wal"; "Not Good Enough - See Me!"
 Keyboards, Sounds [Gunfire, Chainsaw] – Robin Lumley
 Guitar – John Goodsall
 Bass – John Giblin
 Drums, Percussion, Vocals – Phil Collins

on "Dance of the Illegal Aliens";  "Not Good Enough - See Me!"
 Keyboards, Sounds [Gunfire], Vocals – Peter Robinson
 Guitar, Vocals – John Goodsall
 Bass – Percy Jones
 Drums – Mike Clark
 Percussion – Morris Pert

on "Wal to Wal"
 Bass – John Giblin
 Bass – Percy Jones
 Drums, Drum Machine  – Phil Collins

Notes
 The song "Wal to Wal" is the first recorded song on which Phil Collins used a Roland drum machine. (The first recorded Genesis song on which he used a drum machine is "Duchess".)
 Both "Don't Make Waves" and "Soho" were released as singles and feature Phil Collins on vocals.
 The non-album songs "Pool Room Blues" and "Noddy Goes to Sweden" were outtakes from the Product sessions and used as B-sides to one of the singles. "Noddy Goes to Sweden" was also used on the 1980 album release of Do They Hurt?
 Various releases of the album switch the tracks "...And So to F..." and "Not Good Enough - See Me!"

References

1979 albums
Albums with cover art by Hipgnosis
Brand X albums
Albums produced by Neil Kernon
Charisma Records albums
Passport Records albums